Neutral ceramidase C also known as N-acylsphingosine amidohydrolase 2C or non-lysosomal ceramidase C or ASAH2C is a ceramidase enzyme which in humans is encoded by the ASAH2C gene.

References

Further reading